John Dunn Jr. (June 12, 1827 – September 14, 1909) was a member of the Wisconsin State Assembly.

Dunn was born on June 12, 1827 in Kilkenny, Ireland. He emigrated to the United States around 1843 and settled in Poughkeepsie, New York, and he then relocated to Mapleton, Wisconsin in 1849. He served as justice of the peace and town clerk in Mapleton, and also served two terms in the assembly, in 1873 and 1877. He was a Democrat and lived in Ashippun, Wisconsin.

References

External links

People from Kilkenny (city)
Irish emigrants to the United States (before 1923)
People from Ashippun, Wisconsin
1827 births
1909 deaths
Democratic Party members of the Wisconsin State Assembly